The Spanish government departments, commonly known as Ministries, are the main bodies through which the Government of Spain exercise its executive authority. They are also the top level of the General State Administration. The ministerial departments and their organization are created by Royal Decree signed by the Monarch and the Prime Minister and all of them are headed by a Cabinet member called Minister.

Although the main organization is established by the Premier, the ministers have autonomy to organize its own department and to appoint the high-ranking officials of the ministries. It exists the possibility of ministers without portfolio, which are minister-level officials entrusted with a specific task and that do not head a department.

As of 2022, there are currently 22 ministerial departments.

Ministers
The Ministers or Government Ministers (historically Ministers of the Crown) are, after the Prime Minister and the Deputy Prime Ministers, the highest officials of the State Administration and together they form the Government of the Nation, which main decision-making-body is the Council of Ministers.

Appointment and dismissal
The ministers are appointed and dismissed by the Monarch at the proposal of the Prime Minister.

Both appointment and dismissal, to be effective, must to be published at the Official State Gazette, although exists some specific cases, previous to the approval of the 1997 Government Act, which dismissal was not published. Those cases are Manuel Gutiérrez Mellado, minister without portfolio between 1976 and 1977 and Francisco Fernández Ordóñez, minister of Justice from 1980 to 1981.

Unlike the portfolio ministers, the dismissal of ministers without portfolio entails the extinction of all the ministerial structure that supports them.

Responsibilities
According to the Government Act, the ministers, as heads of their departments, have competence and responsibility in the specific sphere of their actions, and they are responsible for exercising the following functions:
 To develop the action of the Government within the scope of their departments, in accordance with the agreements adopted in the Council of Ministers or with the orders of the Prime Minister.
 To exercise the regulatory power in the specific matters of their departments.
 To exercise the powers attributed to them by laws, the rules of organization and functioning of the Government and any other norm.
 To countersign, when necessary, the acts of the Sovereign in the sphere of its responsibilities.

The ministers, as members of the Government, meet in the following collective bodies:
 The Council of Ministers.
 The Government Delegated Committees.

Substitutions
The substitution of the ministers must be determined by a Royal Decree of the Prime Minister, and always has to fall on another member of the Government. The Royal Decree must express the cause and character of the substitution.

Since the entry into force of the Government Act in December 1997, substitutions have taken place on many occasions, either to assume the portfolio temporarily or to replace a minister in a specific matter. It is worth noting the substitution for "delivery" of the minister of Defense Carme Chacón in May 2008. She used her right to maternity leave and her responsibilities were temporary assumed by the Interior Minister, Alfredo Pérez Rubalcaba.

Minister without portfolio
These have been the ministers without portfolio that have existed since the transition to democracy:

Internal organization 

Ministries may have Secretariats of State and, exceptionally, General Secretariats (with rank of undersecretariat) for the management of a sector of administrative activity. The executive bodies that are assigned to them are hierarchically dependent on them. The ministries have, in any case, an Undersecretariat and, depending on it, a General Technical Secretariat for the management of common services (HR, budget, assets, websites, security...).

On the other hand are the Directorates-General, which are the management bodies of one or several functionally homogeneous areas. The directorates-general are organized in deputy directorates-general for the management of the competences entrusted to it. However, deputy directorates-general may be directly attached to other higher level management bodies or to higher bodies of the ministry.

Creation, modification and suppression 
Before of the approval of the 1997 Government Act, the Ministries and Secretariats of State had to be created by law, normally by a direct law passed by the Government in the form of Royal Decree-Law. After, the Government Act allowed the Prime Minister to approve a Royal Decree (secondary legislation) designing the government structure.

Currently, the Prime Minister only creates the Ministries and some of the highest bodies (like secretariats of State and Undersecretariats) while the principal internal organization is delegated into the ministers, which develop the structure of the bodies created by the Premier or create new ones. The order of the Minister is also a royal decree signed the Monarch and countersigned by the minister responsible for the public administration at the proposal of the competent minister.

The lowest bodies such as deputy directorates-general are created by a Ministerial Order (ranked below the royal decree) of the competent minister.

Hierarchy 
The ministers are the superior heads of the department and direct hierarchical superiors of the secretaries of State. The executive bodies depend on the previous ones and they are hierarchically ordered among themselves in the following way: undersecretary, director general and deputy director general. The general secretaries have the rank of undersecretary and the technical general secretaries have the rank of director general.

Ministerial hierarchy:

 Minister.
 Secretaries of State.
 Undersecretaries and General Secretaries.
 Directors general and technical general secretaries.
 Deputy directors general.

Current ministries 
On 13 January 2021, Prime Minister Sánchez announced his ministers which assumed their offices that day.

References